Municipal Park can refer to:
 urban park, a park in the city

Notable parks named Municipal Park include:

 Kristin Armstrong Municipal Park, in Boise, Idaho
 Langan (Municipal) Park, in Mobile, Alabama
 Le Mars Municipal Park and Golf Course Historic District, in Le Mars, Iowa
 Municipal Park (Diekirch), in northern Luxembourg
 Municipal Park (Luxembourg City), in southern Luxembourg
 Northampton Municipal Park, in Bucks County, Pennsylvania

See also:
 Municipal Stadium (disambiguation)